Gastão Elias won the title, beating Diego Schwartzman 6–0, 6–4

Seeds

Draw

Finals

Top half

Bottom half

References
 Main Draw
 Qualifying Draw

Challenger Ciudad de Guayaquil